William Halsey may refer to:

 William Halsey Jr. (1882–1959), U.S. Naval officer and the commander of the United States Third Fleet during part of the Pacific War against Japan.
 William F. Halsey Sr. (1853–1920), his father, U.S. naval officer
 William Darrach Halsey, American encyclopaedist and lexicographer
 William Melton Halsey (1915-1999), American abstract artist
 William Halsey (mayor) (1770–1843), mayor of Newark, New Jersey, 1836–1837
 William Halsey (judge), Irish politician, soldier and judge

See also
 William Halsey Wood (1855–1897), American architect
 Admiral William Halsey Leadership Academy, a public high school in Elizabeth, New Jersey